Daughters Who Pay is a 1925 American silent drama film directed by George Terwilliger, starring Marguerite De La Motte and John Bowers, and featuring Béla Lugosi as Serge Romonsky.

Plot
As described in a film magazine review, Margaret Smith attempts to save her brother by visiting Henry Foster, from whom her brother stole, but Foster refuses leniency. Sonia Borisoff, a Broadway dancer, visits Foster with the offer that she will break her engagement with Dick Foster, the son of the wealthy man, if Margaret's brother is given a pardon. He accepts. In the presence of a crowd of Russian reds, Sonia makes love to their leader when Dick appears. He is indignant, but Sonia then insults the Communist leader after Dick leaves. The reds lure her to a lonely house where they plan to kill her, but Dick intervenes. Some of the reds again corner her in her apartment, but secret service men arrest them. Margaret and Sonia are then revealed to be the same young woman and to be an agent of the secret service. She and Dick then wed.

Cast

Preservation
A print of Daughters Who Pay exists at George Eastman House.

See also
 Béla Lugosi filmography

References

External links

1925 films
1925 drama films
American black-and-white films
Silent American drama films
American silent feature films
Films directed by George Terwilliger
Surviving American silent films
1920s American films